Infurcitinea argentimaculella, the silver-barred clothes moth, is a moth of the  family Tineidae. It was described by Stainton in 1849. It is found in most of Europe, except Ireland, Portugal, Latvia, Lithuania and the Balkan Peninsula.

Description
The wingspan is 7–8 mm.
A fairly robust dark moth with contrasting markings. The antennae are filamentous and about two-thirds as long as the forewings. The head is covered with hair-like scales that are grey-yellow in the middle, darker behind and on the sides. The thorax and the forewings are black-brown, often with a slightly bronze-like sheen. The forewing has silvery-white spots that form three interrupted transverse bands, at the far end of the wing there are three small, round spots. The hind wing is dark grey. The larva is light brown with a black head.

Biology
Adults are on wing from July to early August.

The larvae feed on lichens, including Lepraria species, growing on shady rocks, walls or tree trunks. They construct a lichen covered silken tube. Pupation takes place within the tube.

References
Content in this edit is translated from the existing Norwegian Wikipedia article at :no:Infurcitinea argentimaculella; see its history for attribution.

Moths described in 1849
Meessiinae
Moths of Europe